Freyenstein is a former small town in Brandenburg, Germany. On October 26, 2003 it was merged into the city of Wittstock. The earliest mention of the town was in 1263 as "Vriegenstene". The town had 971 inhabitants on December 31, 2009.

Natives 
 Minna Cauer (1841-1922), German feminist

References

Villages in Brandenburg